The Arrecifes River (Spanish Río Arrecifes) is a river of Argentina. It is a tributary of the Paraná River. It flows into the Paraná Delta area and joins the Paraná de las Palmas  distributary of the Paraná River.

See also
List of rivers of Argentina

References

 Rand McNally, The New International Atlas, 1993.

Rivers of Argentina
Tributaries of the Paraná River
Rivers of Buenos Aires Province